is a Japanese game show that aired on TBS Television from 30 April 1997 to 13 September 2000 and was hosted by Akiko Wada and Ichiro Furatachi.

International versions

External links
 

1997 Japanese television series debuts
2000 Japanese television series endings
1990s Japanese television series
2000s Japanese television series
Japanese game shows
Japanese reality television series
Japanese-language television shows
TBS Television (Japan) original programming